The Privilegium pro Slavis ("Privilege for the Slovaks", sometimes translated as "Privilege for the Slavs") is a privilege granted to the Slovaks in Žilina. , Kingdom of Hungary, by the King Louis I during his visit there in 1381. According to this privilege, Slovaks and Germans each occupied half of the seats in the city council and the mayor should be elected each year, alternating between those nationalities. It was issued after the complaints of Slovak citizens that the Germans refused to respect this old custom. The privilege was preserved from duplication in 1431.

Notes

References

Bibliography
 
 
 

Slovakia in the Kingdom of Hungary
Žilina
Medieval Slovakia